Ararat or in Western Armenian Ararad may refer to:

Personal names
 Ararat, a common first name for Armenian males (pronounced Ararad in Western Armenian)
 Ararat or Araratian, a common family name for Armenians (pronounced Ararad, Araradian in Western Armenian). See Araratyan

Places

Armenian Highland
Mount Ararat, a mountain and a dormant volcanic cone in Turkey
Greater Ararat, the tallest peak in Turkey, part of Mount Ararat
Little Ararat, the sixth tallest peak in Turkey, part of Mount Ararat
Ararat plain, along the Arax River, in Armenia
Ararat Province, Armenia
Ararat, Armenia, a city in Ararat Province
Ararat (village), Armenia, a village in Ararat Province
Ayrarat, a historical province of Armenia

United States
Ararat, North Carolina
Ararat, Virginia
Ararat Township, Pennsylvania
Mount Ararat (Pennsylvania), the highest point in Wayne County, Pennsylvania
Ararat River in Virginia and North Carolina

Australia
Ararat, Victoria, Australia
Ararat Airport, an airport 5 km south of Ararat, Victoria, Australia
Aradale Mental Hospital, also known as the Ararat Asylum
Ararat V/Line rail service, a regional passenger rail service operated by V/Line in Victoria, Australia
HM Prison Ararat, in Ararat, Victoria, Australia
Rural City of Ararat, south-west Victoria, Australia
City of Ararat, a former local government area west-northwest of Melbourne
Shire of Ararat, a former local government area about 200 kilometres (124 mi) west-northwest of Melbourne

History
Mountains of Ararat, referred to in the Bible
Kingdom of Ararat, a variant name of the Iron Age kingdom of Urartu
Republic of Ararat, a breakaway Kurdish state, 1927 to 1931
Ararat rebellion, 1930 uprising of the Kurds of Agn Province in Turkish Kurdistan against the Turkish Government
Ararat, City of Refuge, An attempt by Mordecai Manuel Noah to create a Jewish homeland; a significant event in the history of Zionism.

Associations
Ararat Center for Strategic Research , academic research center and Armenian think tank on security issues
Ararat Chapter, the Chicago chapter of the Armenian Youth Federation

Business and economy
Ararat (brandy), a brandy in Armenia
Ararat International Airlines, now defunct Armenian airline company founded in 2010 and ceased operations in 2013.

Media
Ararad (daily), Armenian language newspaper in Lebanon
Ararat Quarterly, international quarterly of literature, history and culture published in New York City
Ararat, a 1983 novel by D.M. Thomas
Ararat (film), a 2002 film directed by Atom Egoyan
Passage to Ararat, a book by Michael J. Arlen
Ararat, a planet colonized by refugees of Resurgam in the Revelation Space series by Alastair Reynolds
Ararat (novel), a 2017 novel by Christopher Golden

Religion
Araratian Pontifical Diocese, the biggest diocese of the Armenian Apostolic Church with jurisdiction including the Armenian capital Yerevan and the Araradian Province

Sports
Football clubs
 Ararat SC, Erbil, Iraq
 FC Ararat Yerevan, Yerevan, Armenia
 FC Ararat Moscow, Moscow, Russia
 F.C. Ararat Tehran, Tehran, Iran
 FC Ararat Tallinn, Tallinn, Estonia
 FC Ararat-Moskva Yerevan, Yerevan, Armenia
 FC Ararat Issy, Issy-les-Moulineaux, France
 FC Araks Ararat, Ararat, Armenia (originally FC Ararat)
 Ararad SC, or Ararad Sports Association, Lebanese Armenian sports and cultural organization

Others
 Ararat Stadium, Tehran, Iran
 Ararat Tehran BC, an Iranian basketball club based in Tehran, Iran
 Ararad Sports Association, Lebanese Armenian sports association

Other
Ararat anomaly, object appearing on photographs near the summit of Mount Ararat
96205 Ararat, an asteroid named after the mountain
HMAS Ararat, the name of two ships in the Royal Australian Navy
Ararat (EP), an EP by the Israeli metal band Orphaned Land
Ararat, a fictional town in Hungary, a hometown of Dukay family, in the books written by Lajos Zilahy from 1947 until 1965
Ararat, a fictional planet in the p Eridani solar system, in the book Absolution Gap by Alastair Reynolds